Dániel Németh may refer to:
 Dániel Németh (photographer)
 Dániel Németh (footballer)